Kazimierz Sichulski (17 January 1879, Lviv – 6 November 1942, Lviv) was a Polish painter, lithographer and caricaturist; associated with the Young Poland movement. His work was part of the painting event in the art competition at the 1928 Summer Olympics.

Biography 

His father was a railway engineer, who died while Kazimierz was still a small child. For a short time, he studied law at the University of Lviv, but did not return there after serving his mandatory stint with the Austro-Hungarian Army. From 1900 to 1908, he studied at the Kraków Academy of Fine Arts under Leon Wyczółkowski, Józef Mehoffer and Stanisław Wyspiański. He received a scholarship and continued his studies in Rome, Munich and Paris at the Académie Colarossi. During this time, he married an actress named Bronisława Rudlicka (1875–1920).

He made his début in 1903 at a showing of the Kraków Society of Friends of Fine Arts. From then until 1905, he also worked as a cartoonist for the short-lived satirical magazine, Liberum Veto. In 1905, he became one of the founding members of the artistic circle at the Zielony Balonik (Green Balloon) cabaret and joined the Society of Polish Artists "Sztuka". While visiting Vienna, he joined the Hagenbund and was a member until 1921.

This resulted in a lifetime fascination with their culture and customs. Some of his best-known paintings are depictions of their folk costumes.

During World War I, he fought in the Polish Legions as the commander of an artillery platoon. He also worked at the Supreme National Committee and served as an artist for the 3rd Battalion. Later, he became a warrant officer in the Austrian Army, serving at the Ministry of Defense. In 1916, his childless marriage ended in divorce and he remarried into a noble family.

The following year, he was awarded the "Golden Laurel" by the Polish Academy of Literature for his contributions to Polish art.

After the Occupation of Poland he lost his position and his health began to deteriorate. He died at home of heart disease after a brief stay in the hospital.

Works

Genres

Hutsul depictions

Styles

Other works

References

Further reading 
 Ihor Chomyn, Kazimierz Sichulski, 1879 – 1942: malarstwo, rysunek, grafika, Silesian Museum and Lviv National Art Gallery, 2000

External links 

 More paintings by Sichulski @ Pinakoteka
 "Гуцульська сецесія Казимира Сіхульського" (Hutsul Art Nouveau by Kazimierz Sichulski) from День by Yarolav Kravchenko

1879 births
1942 deaths
19th-century Polish painters
19th-century Polish male artists
20th-century Polish painters
20th-century Polish male artists
Polish printmakers
Golden Laurel of the Polish Academy of Literature
Académie Colarossi alumni
Polish portrait painters
Polish caricaturists
Artists from Lviv
20th-century printmakers
Olympic competitors in art competitions
Polish male painters
Polish legionnaires (World War I)
Austro-Hungarian military personnel of World War I